Elon Phoenix women's basketball is women's basketball program played at Elon University. They became part of the Colonial Athletic Association (CAA) on July 1, 2014.

History

Head coaches

NCAA tournament results

Conference affiliations
North State Conference
Carolinas Conference
South Atlantic Conference
Big South Conference
Southern Conference
Colonial Athletic Association

All-Americans
1974-75 Susan Yow
1979-80 Vanessa Corbett
1981-82 Vanessa Corbett

Honorable Mention All-Americans
Kodak All-American
1996-97 Lakia Hayes
Kodak All-American
1997-98 Lakia Hayes

Championships
Conference
1981, 1982, 2017
District
1982
AIAW
1974

References

External links